Gil Martins Felippe (May 25, 1934 – August 19, 2014) was a Brazilian scientist (Plant Physiology) and writer. He was known as Gil Felippe in his most recent books. He was the son of Bernardina Martins Felippe (15 July 1909 – 22 January 1995), a teacher and Virgilio Felippe (22 May 1904 – 14 July 1996), an accountant.

Biography
Gil Felippe received a PhD from the University of Edinburgh, Scotland, where he did post-doctoral work in plant physiology. His PhD thesis was done under the supervision of Professor John E. Dale. He was a bachelor of Natural History from the University of São Paulo, in São Paulo. His primary and secondary studies were done at the Instituto de Educação Dr. Alvaro Guião, in São Carlos. He also became a teacher of children from the same institute.

He started his academic career as a biologist at the Instituto de Botânica de São Paulo. Later he was an invited lecturer at the Department of Botany of the University of São Paulo (USP), a post-doctoral research fellow at the Botany Department of the University of Edinburgh and Full Professor at the Department of Plant Physiology of the University of Campinas (UNICAMP). His last academic position was as a Guest Professor at the Instituto de Botânica de São Paulo.

He was a Retired Professor of UNICAMP. At the Department of Plant Physiology of UNICAMP he was one of the lecturers in the Discipline of Plant Development of the Graduation Course. He supervised students starting research, as well as students on masters or doctoral work. He was always very active doing his own research work, in the lab and in the field, mainly in cerrado regions. He was also very active in participating of International and Brazilian Botanical Meetings. He retired from the University of Campinas in 1991. He published 168 scientific papers and was the supervisor of 17 MSc theses and of 12 PhD theses. After retiring he became a writer.

Scientific community

He was a founding member of the Association of São Paulo Biologists and then President of the ethical council of the Association  (1975–1977). He was also a founder member of the Botanical Society of São Paulo and its first President (1981–1982) and President for a second time (1989–1993). He was the Chairman of the São Paulo Section of the Brazilian Botanical Society (1980–1981). He was a Meritorius Member of the Brazilian Botanical Society. He was a founder of the Brazilian Journal of Botany and its main editor for several years (1980–1982; 1989–1993). He was a member of the Brazilian Society for the Progress of Science - SBPC, the UK Society for Experimental Biology and the Federation of European Societies of Plant Physiology. He was a Research-Fellow of the National Council of Technological and Scientific Development, CNPq (1977–1999). He was a Full Member of the Academy of Sciences of the State of São Paulo, since 1977. He was a coordinator of the Biology area of the Foundation for Implementation of Research of the State of São Paulo - FAPESP (1982) and coordinator of the Group of Research in Zoology and Botany of the National Council of Scientific and Technological Development – CNPq (1982–1985).

Scientific Information Books (in Portuguese)

 O saber do sabor – as plantas nossas de cada dia / Understanding taste – our everyday plants (watercolours by Maria Cecília Tomasi). Editora Salamandra, Lisboa e Capacitas, São Paulo, 192p, 1998.
 Entre o jardim e a horta – as flores que vão para a mesa / Between the garden and the kitchen-garden – edible flowers (watercolours by Maria Cecília Tomasi). Editora SENAC, São Paulo, 286p, 2003.
 No Rastro de Afrodite: plantas afrodisíacas e culinária / On the steps of Aphrodite – aphrodisiac plants and cookery (watercolours by Maria Cecília Tomasi). Ateliê Editorial e Editora SENAC, São Paulo, 310p, 2004.
 Frutas – sabor à primeira dentada / Dessert-fruits – taste at the first bite (watercolours by Maria Cecília Tomasi). Editora SENAC, São Paulo, 302p, 2005.
 O saber do sabor – as plantas nossas de cada dia / Understanding taste – our everyday plants (watercolours by Maria Cecília Tomasi). 2nd ed. Editora Setembro, Holambra, 157p, 2006
 Grãos e sementes – a vida encapsulada / Grains and seeds – encapsulated life (watercolours by Maria Cecília Tomasi). Editora SENAC, São Paulo, 430p, 2007.
 Do Éden ao Éden – jardins botânicos e a aventura das plantas / From Eden to Eden – botanic gardens and the adventure of plants (with Lilian Penteado Zaidan). Editora SENAC, São Paulo, 318p, 2008.
 Árvores frutíferas exóticas / Exotic fruit-trees. Editora Sarandi, São Paulo, 64p, 2008.
 Amaro Macedo – o solitário do cerrado / Amaro Macedo – the loner of the cerrado (with Maria do Carmo Duarte Macedo). Ateliê Editorial, Cotia, 224p, 2009.
 Venenosas - plantas que matam também curam / Poisonous plants - plants that kill also heal (illustrations Maria Cecília Tomasi). Editora SENAC, São Paulo, 352p, 2009.
 Árvores frutíferas brasileiras / Braziian fruit-trees. Editora Sarandi, São Paulo, 64p, 2009.
 Amendoim - história, botânica e culinária / Peanuts - history, botany and culinary. Editora SENAC, São Paulo, 232p, 2011.
 O rio na parede / The river on the wall. Ateliê Editorial, São Paulo, 85p, 2012.
 Gaia: o lado oculto das plantas - Tubérculos, rizomas, raízes e bulbos /Gaia: the ocult side of plants - tubers, rhizomes, roots and bulbs. Edições Tapioca, São Paulo, 118p, 2012.
 Cães, gatos e plantas - o veneno ao alcance das patas / Dogs, cats and plants - the poison within reach of paws. Editora Setembro, Holambra, 160p, 2012.

Prizes

The book No rastro de Afrodite – plantas afrodisíacas e culinária (On the steps of Aphrodite – aphrodisiac plants and cookery) received two Gourmand World Cookbook Awards in 2004: best book of Brazilian culinary history and best book of illustrations of a Brazilian culinary book. 
The book Grãos e sementes – a vida encapsulada (Grains and seeds – encapsulated life) received two Gourmand World Cookbook Awards in 2007: best book in Brazil of a single subject in culinary matters and best book of illustrations of a Brazilian culinary book.

PhD Thesis

 Effects of a quaternary ammonium compound and gibberellic acid on the growth of Phaseolus. Ph.D. Thesis. University of Edinburgh. 128p, 1967.

Technical books

 Fitocromo e crescimento vegetal (translation of "Phytochrome and plant growth" de R.E. Kendrick & B. Frankland). EPU & EDUSP, São Paulo, 76p, 1981.
 Anatomia do vegetal em desenvolvimento (technical revision of the translation of "Developmental plant anatomy" de A.R. Gemmell). EPU & EDUSP, São Paulo, 73p, 1981.
 Luz e vida vegetal (translation of "Light and plant life" de J.M. Whatley & F.R. Whatley). EPU & EDUSP, São Paulo, 101p, 1981.
 Fisiologia do desenvolvimento vegetal (with I.F.M. Válio, M.F.A. Pereira, R.R. Sharif & S.R.V. Santos). Editora Campus, Rio de Janeiro, 66p, 1983.
 Fisiologia do desenvolvimento vegetal (with I.F.M. Válio, M.F.A. Pereira, R.R. Sharif & S.R.V. Santos). Editora da UNICAMP, Campinas, 64p, 2º edição, 1985.

References

 Biblioteca Digital da UNICAMP - Dissertações e Teses defendidas no Instituto de Biologia - IB <http://libdigi.unicamp.br/document/list.php?tid=35>. Última consulta em 17/07/2009.
 Conselho Regional de Biologia - sobre o livro "Frutas - Sabor À Primeira Dentada" <https://web.archive.org/web/20060624223123/http://www.crbio1.org.br/acontece/geral.asp?action=acontece&area=sup&menu=livros&id=377>. Última visita em 01/06/2009.
 Conselho Regional de Biologia - sobre o livro "ENTRE O JARDIM E A HORTA – As flores que vão para a mesa" <C:\Documents and Settings\Gil\Desktop\Sobre Gil\Conselho Regional de Biologia.mht>. Última visita em 01/06/2009.
 Currículo do Sistema de Currículos Lattes - Gil Martins Felippe <http://lattes.cnpq.br/7615400101218093>. Última atualização em 12/2009.
 Editora SENAC - sobre Gil Martins Felippe <https://web.archive.org/web/20071024122539/http://www.editorasenacsp.com.br/autor_new.cfm?id=1329>. Última consulta em 01/07/2009.
 Felippe, G. M. . Anatomia do vegetal em desenvolvimento - Revisão. 1. ed. São Paulo: EPU / EDUSP, 1981. v. 1. 73 p.
 Felippe, G. M. . Árvores Frutíferas Exóticas. 1. ed. São Paulo: Sarandi, 2008. v. 1. 64 p, 
 Felippe, G. M. . Entre o jardim e a horta - as flores que vão para a mesa. 1ª ed. São Paulo: Editora SENAC, 2003. v. 1. 286 p., 
 Felippe, G. M. . Entre o jardim e a horta: as flores que vão para a mesa. 2ª ed. São Paulo: Editora SENAC, 2004. v. 1. 286 p.
 Felippe, G. M. . Fitocromo e Crescimento Vegetal - Tradução. 1. ed. SAO PAULO: EPU / EDUSP, 1981. v. 1. 76 p.
 Felippe, G. M. . Frutas - sabor à primeira dentada. 1ª ed. São Paulo: Editora SENAC, São Paulo, 2005. v. 1. 302 p., 
 Felippe, G. M. . Grãos e Sementes - A vida encapsulada. 1. ed. São Paulo: Editora SENAC São Paulo, 2007. v. 1. 430 p., 
 Felippe, G. M. . Luz e Vida Vegetal - Tradução. 1. ed. SAO PAULO: EPU / EDUSP, 1982. v. 1. 101 p.
 Felippe, G. M. . No rastro de Afrodite – plantas afrodisíacas e culinária. 2º ed. São Paulo: Ateliê Editorial e Editora SENAC, 2005. v 1 311p.  (Ateliê) e  (Editora Senac São Paulo)
 Felippe, G. M. . O Saber do Sabor - As plantas nossas de cada dia. 1. ed. Lisboa (Portugal) e São Paulo: Editora Salamandra (Lisboa) e Editora Capacitas Internacional (São Paulo), 1998. 193 p.
 Felippe, G. M. . O Saber do Sabor - As plantas nossas de cada dia. 2º. ed. Holambra, SP: Editora Setembro, 2005. v. 1. 157 p., 
 Felippe, G. M. ; MACEDO, M. C. D. . Amaro Macedo - o solitário do cerrado. 1. ed. São Paulo: Ateliê Editorial, 2009. v. 1. 224 p., 
 Felippe, G. M. ; VÁLIO, I. F. M. ; PEREIRA, M. F. A. ; SHARIF, R. R. ; VIEIRA, S. R. . Fisiologia do Desenvolvimento Vegetal. 1. ed. CAMPINAS: UNICAMP, 1985. v. 1. 66 p.
 Felippe, G. M. ; ZAIDAN, L. B. P. . Do Éden ao Éden -jardins botânicos e aventura das plantas. 1. ed. São Paulo: Editora SENAC São Paulo, 2008. v. 1. 318 p., 
 Folha On-Line - Botânico ensina a florescer as refeições <http://www1.folha.uol.com.br/folha/equilibrio/noticias/ult263u2960.shtml>. Última consulta em 28/06/2009.
 Gazeta do Povo, Caderno Rascunho - A vida que segue <http://rascunho.gazetadopovo.com.br/a-vida-que-segue/>. Última consulta em 11 de junho de 2013.
 Horta, Nina. Dezenove mangaritos. Folha de S.Paulo, Ilustrada, p 4, 02 de julho de 1999.
 Horta, Nina. Escritores tiram do forno seus pratos quentes. Folha de S.Paulo, Ilustrada, p 4, 12 de setembro de 1998.
 Horta, Nina. Por onde andarás ioimbina? Folha de S.Paulo, Ilustrada, p 4, 15 de agosto de 2001.
 Instituto de Biociências - Universidade de São Paulo. Graduados pela Faculdade de Filosofia, Ciências e Letras <http://www.ib.usp.br/ibhistoria/50anos/1934grad.htm>. Última visita em 18/07/2009.
 Instituto de Botânica - histórico da Seção de Fisiologia e Bioquímica de Plantas <https://web.archive.org/web/20041214191730/http://www.ibot.sp.gov.br/INSTITUTO/fisio.htm>. Última consulta em 14/07/2009
 Jornal do Conselho regional de Biologia (1ª região - SP,MT, MS). Ano VII, nº 95, 2002. p. 5-6-7, 8 e capa.
 Lancellotti, Silvio. Professor ensina a alquimia das plantas. O Estado de S. Paulo, Caderno 2, p 25, 31 de agosto de 1998.
 Ferri, M. G. Fisiologia Vegetal 2. São Paulo: E.P.U. & EDUSP, 1979. v1. 392p.
 Melo Lopes, Isaias. Com o tempero da ciência. Revista Gula, São Paulo, nº 71, p. 18, setembro de 1998
 Membros da Academia de Ciências do Estado de São Paulo  (ACIESP) <https://web.archive.org/web/20090331180312/http://www.acadciencias.org.br/membros-biociencias.html>. Última visita em 17/07/2009.
 Nogueira, E.  Uma História Brasileira da Botânica. 1. ed. São Paulo: Marco Zero Editora, 2000. 225 p., 
 O Biólogo nº 5 - 2008. <http://issuu.com/mteles13/docs/revista_05_2008/6>. Última visita em 16/07/2009
 O Biólogo nº 8 - 2008. <http://issuu.com/mteles13/docs/obiologo/10>. Última visita em 16/07/2009
 Sistema NOU-RAU - Biblioteca Digital da UNICAMP <http://libdigi.unicamp.br/document/list.php?tid=7>. Última visita em 01/06/2009.
 Sociedade Brasileira de Fisiologia Vegetal - Luiz Fernando Gouveia Labouriau <https://web.archive.org/web/20090124083826/http://sbfv.org.br/arquivos/labourian.pdf>. Última consulta em 18/07/2009
Universidade Estadual de Campinas - 500 teses na Biologia Vegetal <https://web.archive.org/web/20110604030503/http://www.unicamp.br/unicamp/divulgacao/2004/06/04/pos-em-biologia-vegetal-registra-mais-de-500-teses>. Última visita em 15/07/2009.
 Google Scholar - Felippe G <https://scholar.google.com/scholar?hl=en&lr=&q=Felippe+G&btnG=Search>. Última visita em 01/06/2009.

20th-century Brazilian botanists
Brazilian science writers
1934 births
2014 deaths
21st-century Brazilian botanists